Carl von Voit (31 October 1831 – 31 January 1908) was a German physiologist and dietitian.

Biography 
Voit was born in Amberg, the son of August von Voit and Mathilde Burgett. From 1848 to 1854 he studied at the universities of Munich and Würzburg. At Munich, his teachers were Justus von Liebig and Max Joseph Pettenkofer, and at Würzburg, he was a pupil of Albert von Kölliker. In 1855 he furthered his education at the University of Göttingen under chemist Friedrich Wohler, and in 1856/57 served as an assistant to Theodor von Bischoff in Munich. In 1857 he obtained his habilitation, and from 1863 was a full professor of physiology as well as curator of the physiological collection at the University of Munich.

Contributions 
Carl von Voit is considered by many to be the "father" of modern dietetics. As a chemist and physiologist, he found that the amount of nitrogen in excreted urea is a measure for the protein turnover. Using a respiration chamber, he could characterize the significance of individual nutrients, known as Voitsche Kostmaß.

He was also a successful teacher, attracting international students to the University of Munich and thus significantly influencing the US nutritionist, among others. One of his better known German pupils was Max Rubner.

Carl von Voit died in Munich.

The German Nutrition Society has been awarding the Carl-von-Voit-medal since 1961.

Works 
 Die Gesetze der Ernährung des Fleischfressers (Leipzig 1860)
 Über die Wirkung des Kochsalzes, des Kaffees und der Muskelbewegung auf den Stoffwechsel (Munich 1860)
 Über die Kost in öffentlichen Anstalten (Munich 1876)
 Untersuchung der Kost in einigen öffentlichen Anstalten (Munich 1877)
 Über die Entwickelung der Erkenntnis (Munich 1879)
 Physiologie des allgemeinen Stoffwechsels und der Ernährung (volume 6, first section of Ludimar Hermann's "Handbuch der Physiologie", Leipzig 1881)
 Zeitschrift für Biologie (as publisher, together with Ludwig von Buhl und Max von Pettenkofer)

References

External links
 

1831 births
1908 deaths
Dietitians
People from Amberg
German physiologists
Science teachers
Academic staff of the Ludwig Maximilian University of Munich